Martin Fecko (born 8 October 1962 in Prešov) is a Slovak politician, currently serving as a Member of the National Council. He has been an MP since 2010 and a State Secretary at the Ministry of Agriculture between March 2020 and July 2021. Fecko was originally a member of the Freedom and Solidarity caucus, since 2012 he has represented the Ordinary People and Independent Personalities party as one of its co-founders.

Fecko studied at the Slovak University of Agriculture, graduating in 1985. Following his graduation, he worked in various positions in the public sector related to agriculture.

References 

1962 births
Living people
OĽaNO politicians
People from Prešov
Members of the National Council (Slovakia) 2010-2012
Members of the National Council (Slovakia) 2012-2016
Members of the National Council (Slovakia) 2016-2020
Members of the National Council (Slovakia) 2020-present